BAFTA Awards 2005 may refer to:

59th British Academy Film Awards
British Academy Television Awards 2005